Seaward may refer to:

People:
Carolyn Seaward (born 1960), former beauty queen who appeared in the 1983 Bond film Octopussy
John Seaward (1786–1858), British civil engineer and mechanical engineer
Kevin Seaward (born 1983), Northern Irish marathon runner from Belfast, assistant headteacher at a school in Leicestershire
Paul Seaward, British historian specialising in seventeenth-century English history
Richard Seaward Cantrell (1825–1872), Member of Parliament from Dunedin, New Zealand
Sydney Seaward (1884–1967), English actor
Tracey Seaward (born 1965), English film producer

Geography:
Seaward Kaikoura Range, two parallel ranges of mountains in the northeast of the South Island of New Zealand
Seaward River, river in New Zealand's South Island
Seaward Rock, a rock close to the northeast of Mollyhawk Island in the Bay of Isles, South Georgia

Sailing:
Seaward Eagle, American sailboat first built in 1996
Seaward Fox, American trailerable sailboat first built in 1993
Seaward 22, American trailerable sailboatd first built in 1985
Seaward 23, American trailerable sailboat first built in 1984
Seaward 24, American trailerable sailboat first built in 1984
Seaward 25, American trailerable sailboat first built in 1984
Seaward 26RK, American trailerable sailboat first built in 2005
Seaward 32RK, American sailboat first built in 2006
Seaward 46RK, American sailboat first built in 2012

Other shipping:
MS Seaward, cruise ship owned and last operated by Star Cruises
USS Seaward (IX-60), schooner of the United States Navy during World War II
Seaward-class defense boats, large patrol craft for the Indian Navy

See also
Saward
Sayward
Seward (disambiguation)
Siward (disambiguation)
Soward